Xerochlora mesotheides is a species of emerald moth in the family Geometridae. It is found in Central America and North America.

The MONA or Hodges number for Xerochlora mesotheides is 7082.

References

Further reading

External links

 

Hemitheini
Articles created by Qbugbot
Moths described in 1969